Ann Johnston may refer to:

Ann Johnston (figure skater), Canadian figure skater
Ann Johnston (American politician), former mayor of Stockton, California

See also
Anne Johnston (disambiguation)